My Best Friend's Birthday is a 1987 amateur comedy film directed, edited, co-written, co-produced and starring Quentin Tarantino. The film was shot in black-and-white and was originally meant to have a  runtime of 70 minutes, but only 36 minutes of the film are edited altogether, leaving the project unfinished.

Plot 
It’s Mickey’s birthday, and his girlfriend just left him. His friend Clarence shows up to give him a birthday he'll never forget.

Cast

Production
The film was made while Tarantino was working at the Video Archives, now closed, in Manhattan Beach, California. The project started in 1984, when Hamann wrote a short 30- to 40-page script.

Tarantino became attached to the project as co-writer and director, and he and Hamann expanded the script to 80 pages. On an estimated budget of $5,000, the film was originally planned in a Super 8mm format. However,   when Tarantino was able to borrow a 16mm camera from film director Fred Olen Ray, the film was shot in 16mm over the course of the next four years. Hamann and Tarantino starred in the film, along with several video store and acting class buddies, and worked on the crew, which included fellow Video Archives employees Rand Vossler and Roger Avary. It is the most overtly comedic film that Tarantino has made. In an interview with Charlie Rose (available on the Region 1 Collector's Edition DVD of Pulp Fiction), he referred to it as a "Martin and Lewis kind of thing."

It was long alleged that the original cut was about 70 minutes long, but due to a film lab fire, only 36 minutes of the film still exist. In 2019, a book titled My Best Friend's Birthday: The Making of a Quentin Tarantino Film, written by Andrew J. Rausch, was published by BearManor Media. The book features interviews with all of the film's principal personnel, including Quentin Tarantino, Craig Hamann, and Roger Avary. In the book, it is revealed the fire story was fabricated, with Tarantino choosing not to dismiss it as he thought it sounded interesting. In actuality, some rolls of film were simply discarded by mistake, and Tarantino, unsatisfied with the final product, edited together the scenes he liked, leaving the project unfinished. However, he has not dismissed the possibility of restoring and completing the film one day. The surviving footage has been edited together and shown at several film festivals.

See also
List of incomplete or partially lost films

References

External links 

Films directed by Quentin Tarantino
Films with screenplays by Quentin Tarantino
Films produced by Quentin Tarantino
1987 films
American comedy films
1987 comedy films
American black-and-white films
1980s unfinished films
Unreleased American films
American independent films
Films about prostitution in the United States
1980s English-language films
1980s American films